Marcellas Reynolds is an American actor, author, entertainment reporter, and television host. His notable television appearances include Access Hollywood, E! Live from the Red Carpet, Good Day L.A., The Bold and the Beautiful, and Yes, Dear. Reynolds began his television career in 2002 on CBS's hit television series Big Brother season three, becoming the first openly gay black man cast on a major network reality series. His writing has appeared in Chicago magazine, Essence, The Guardian, and L.A. Style Magazine. Reynolds is the author of Supreme models: Iconic Black women who revolutionized fashion and Supreme actresses: Iconic black women who revolutionized Hollywood.

Personal life
Marcellas Reynolds was born in Chicago, Illinois and raised in Chicago's South Shore. He graduated from Kenwood Academy and briefly attended the University of Illinois Chicago's Circle campus.

Early career
In 1995, Aria Model and Talent owners Marie Anderson and Mary Boncher discovered Reynolds while waiting tables. Represented during his model career by Ford Models, Beatrice Models in Milan, and Goodfellas Model Agency in London, Reynolds modeled for the GAP, Ralph Lauren, Tommy Hilfiger, Nautica, and photographers Norman Jean Roy and Bruce Weber.

In 2000, while modeling in New York, Marcellas Reynolds began working as a fashion stylist. His list of advertising clientele includes H&M, Kohl's, Lord & Taylor, and Macy's. His editorial work has appeared in British GQ, InStyle, and British Vogue. His list of past clientele includes Rebecca Hall, Jayma Mays, David Schwimmer, Sharon Stone, and Justin Timberlake.

In 2002 after his appearance on CBS's Big Brother season three, Reynolds began his career as an entertainment reporter and television host working for BET, CBS, E!, FOX, and the Style Network. His celebrity interviews include Miss America 2019 Nia Franklin, Brad Garrett, Tyrese Gibson, Beverly Johnson, Daphne Maxwell Reid, Debra Messing, Lupita Nyong'o, Issa Rae, and Gabrielle Union.

Reynolds's early television appearances include BET's Remixed, CBS This Morning, CNN Newsroom, E! Network's E! Live from the Red Carpet, Perfect Catch, Style Network's How Do I Look? and Style Star, The Tyra Banks Show, and Yes, Dear. In 2005, Reynolds appeared as Micah Okwu on CBS's daytime soap opera, The Bold and the Beautiful. Reynolds also has a cameo in the 2009 movie Eating Out 3: All You Can Eat.

Current career
Reynolds's recent television appearances include Access Hollywood, Daily Mail TV, Good Day Chicago, Tamron Hall, and multiple appearances as an entertainment reporter for Good Day L.A. In 2018 Reynolds appeared on The Good Place as Tahani's favorite patissier, and in 2019, Reynolds appeared on How to Get Away with Murder as a corrupt FBI agent.

On October 8, 2019, Reynolds published Supreme models: Iconic Black women who revolutionized fashion, the first-ever art book celebrating top black models, which was filled with revealing essays, interviews, and stunning photographs. American Vogue named Supreme models "One of the Nine Best Books of 2019." In 2020, Essence named Supreme models "The Number One Book on Black Style."  In 2021, BookAuthority named Supreme models one of the "100 Best Fashion Books of All Time."

In November 2020, Reynolds announced the fall 2021 publication of his second book, Supreme actresses: Iconic Black women who revolutionized Hollywood, a comprehensive collection of photographs, interviews, and profiles of the most influential Black actresses who have worked in film, television, and theater. On October 26, 2021, Abrams Books published Supreme actresses. Town and Country Magazine named it "One of October 2021's Best Books."

In September 2021, YouTube announced its acquisition of Reynolds's book Supreme models as a six-part documentary series set for a Fall 2022 premiere. Reynolds serves as an executive producer on "Supreme Models," along with R.J. Cutler, Iman, Jane Cha Cutler, Douglas Keeve, Rolake Bamgbose, Donny Jackson, and Trevor Smith.

Publications
Reynolds, Marcellas. Supreme models: Iconic Black women who revolutionized fashion. Illustrated. Abrams, 2019.

Reynolds, Marcellas. Supreme actresses: Iconic Black women who revolutionized Hollywood. Illustrated, Abrams, 2021.

Filmography

References

External links
Official Website of Marcellas Reynolds

Marcellas Reynolds on Instagram
Marcellas Reynolds on Facebook
Marcellas Reynolds on Twitter
Supreme Models Book on Instagram
Supreme Actresses Book on Instagram

Big Brother (American TV series) contestants
LGBT African Americans
Living people
Fashion stylists
Male actors from Chicago
Year of birth missing (living people)
American gay actors